Heathey Lane Halt was a railway station in the village of Scarisbrick, Lancashire. The station opened on 1 March 1907 as a halt on the Liverpool, Southport and Preston Junction Railway, and consisted of simple cinder based platforms at track level. It was situated to the north of the B5243 road bridge at Heathey Lane, to which it was connected by wooden steps. The station closed to passengers on 26 September 1938, though the line remained open for goods traffic until 21 January 1952. The track was left in place until 1964 for the storage of excursion stock.

References

Sources

External links 
 Heathey Lane Halt via Disused Stations
 The line and mileages via Railwaycodes

Disused railway stations in the Borough of West Lancashire
Former Lancashire and Yorkshire Railway stations
Railway stations in Great Britain opened in 1907
Railway stations in Great Britain closed in 1938